Vancouver North was a federal electoral district in British Columbia, Canada, that was represented in the House of Commons of Canada from 1925 to 1949.

This riding was created in 1924 from parts of Burrard and Comox—Alberni ridings.

A redistribution in 1933 rearranged the riding's boundaries. The Sunshine Coast and other areas west of it were added to Comox-Alberni, and portions of the Fraser Valley north of the Fraser River were added to Vancouver North. Burnaby north of the BCER line was also in the riding, which excluded the City of New Westminster, which had its own riding.

It was abolished in 1947 when it was redistributed into Burnaby—Richmond and Coast—Capilano ridings.

Members of Parliament

Election results

See also 

 List of Canadian federal electoral districts
 Past Canadian electoral districts

External links 
Riding history from the Library of Parliament

Former federal electoral districts of British Columbia